Tales from the Brothers Gibb: A History in Song is a box set compilation released by the Bee Gees in 1990. Originally released on four cassettes and four compact discs, Tales is a summary of the Bee Gees output from their third album, 1967's Bee Gees 1st to the group's most recent album (at the time), 1989's One.

Considering the peculiar nature of the Gibbs' catalogue, the compilers neatly arranged each disc/cassette to represent the Bee Gees at different periods of their career called Chapters. Chapter I consists of songs from their folky/psychedelic era of 1967–1970; Chapter II covers the ballad-heavy period of 1971–1974; Chapter III tracks the disco era from 1975–1979 and Chapter IV consists of the Gibbs' output in the '80s, including material from their two Warner Bros. albums.

Release
Many B-sides made their CD debut on Tales as well as solo material, unreleased tracks and live performances not available anywhere else. Album cuts, with a few exceptions, were not included here as to keep the focus on single releases.

Several tracks received new stereo mixes prepared by Bill Inglot especially for this set. "World", "I've Gotta Get a Message to You" and "Words" are notable for the improved stereo mixes found on Tales. "Tomorrow Tomorrow" received its first stereo mix (the Best of Bee Gees 1986 CD featured the song in mono while the original 1969 Best of Bee Gees LP did not include the track), while many of the B-sides such as "Sinking Ships", "Barker of the UFO" and "The Singer Sang His Song" were mixed in stereo for the first time.

The four live songs that ended the collection were taken from their highly successful "All for One" concert in Australia. That concert became available on CD in its entirety in 2014.

The packaging includes symbols for each song, photos taken in 1989 at a video shoot, and comments from one of the brothers on each song in the accompanying book. No historic photos were used.

Track listing

On releases of Tales outside North America, three Barry Gibb solo tracks were added to Chapter IV from the "Hawks" soundtrack right after Robin Gibb's "Toys": "My Eternal Love", "Where Tomorrow Is" and "Letting Go".

References

Bee Gees compilation albums
1990 compilation albums
Polydor Records compilation albums